Lucius Cornelius Sulla Felix (138–78 BC), commonly known as Sulla, was a Roman general and statesman. He won the first large-scale civil war in Roman history and became the first man of the Republic to seize power through force.

Sulla had the distinction of holding the office of consul twice, as well as reviving the dictatorship. A gifted and innovative general, he achieved numerous successes in wars against foreign and domestic opponents. Sulla rose to prominence during the war against the Numidian king Jugurtha, whom he captured as a result of Jugurtha's betrayal by the king's allies, although his superior Gaius Marius took credit for ending the war. He then fought successfully against Germanic tribes during the Cimbrian War, and Italian allies during the Social War. He was awarded the Grass Crown for his bravery at the Battle of Nola. Sulla was closely associated with Venus, adopting the title Epaphroditos meaning favored of Aphrodite/Venus.

Sulla played an important role in the long political struggle between the optimates and populares factions at Rome. He was a leader of the optimates, which sought to maintain senatorial supremacy against the populist reforms advocated by the populares, headed by Marius. In a dispute over the command of the war against Mithridates, initially awarded to Sulla by the Senate, but withdrawn as a result of Marius' intrigues, Sulla marched on Rome in an unprecedented act and defeated Marian forces in battle. The populares nonetheless seized power once he left with his army to Asia. He returned victorious from the east in 82 BC, marched a second time on Rome, and crushed the populares and their Italian allies at the Battle of the Colline Gate. He then revived the office of dictator, which had been inactive since the Second Punic War, over a century before. He used his powers to purge his opponents, and reform Roman constitutional laws,  to restore the primacy of the Senate and limit the power of the tribunes of the plebs. Resigning his dictatorship in 79 BC, Sulla retired to private life and died the following year.

Sulla's military coup was enabled by Marius's military reforms, that bound the army's loyalty with the general rather than to the Roman Republic, and permanently destabilized the Roman power structure. Later political leaders such as Julius Caesar would follow his precedent in attaining political power through force.

Family and youth
Sulla, the son of Lucius Cornelius Sulla and the grandson of Publius Cornelius Sulla, was born into a branch of the patrician gens Cornelia, but his family had fallen to an impoverished condition at the time of his birth. Publius Cornelius Rufinus, one of Sulla's ancestors and also the last member of his family to be consul, was banished from the Senate after having been caught possessing more than 10 pounds of silver plate. Sulla's family thereafter did not reach the highest offices of the state until Sulla himself. His father may have served as praetor, but details are unclear; his father married twice and Sulla' stepmother was of considerable wealth, which certainly helped the young Sulla's ambitions.

One story, "as false as it is charming", relates that when Sulla was a baby, his nurse was carrying him around the streets, until a strange woman walked up to her and said, "Puer tibi et reipublicae tuae felix", which can be translated as, "The boy will be a source of luck to you and your state". After his father's death, around the time Sulla reached adulthood, Sulla found himself impoverished. He might have been disinherited, though it was "more likely" that his father simply had nothing to bequeath. Lacking ready money, Sulla spent his youth among Rome’s comedians, actors, lute players, and dancers. During these times on the stage, after initially only singing, he started writing plays, Atellan farces, a kind of crude comedy. Plutarch mentions that during his last marriage to Valeria, he still kept company with "actresses, musicians, and dancers, drinking with them on couches night and day. 

Sulla almost certainly received a normal education for his class, grounded in ancient Greek and Latin classics. Sallust declares him well-read, intelligent, and he was fluent in Greek. Regardless, by the standards of the Roman political class, Sulla was a very poor man. His first wife was called either Ilia or Julia. If the latter, he may have married into the Julii Caesares. He had one child from this union, before his first wife's death. He married again, with a woman called Aelia, of which nothing is known other than her name. During these marriages, he engaged in an affair with Nicopolis, who also was older than him. The means by which Sulla attained the fortune which later would enable him to ascend the ladder of Roman politics are not clear; Plutarch refers to two inheritances, one from his stepmother (who loved him dearly) and the other from his mistress Nicopolis.  accepts these inheritances without much comment and places them around Sulla's turning thirty years of age.

Early career

Due to his meeting the minimum age requirement of thirty, he stood for the quaestorship in 108 BC. Normally, candidates had to have first served for ten years in the military, but by Sulla's time, this had been superseded by an age requirement. He was then assigned by lot to serve under the consul Gaius Marius.

Jugurthine War (107–106 BC) 

The Jugurthine War had started in 112 BC when Jugurtha, grandson of Massinissa of Numidia, claimed the entire kingdom of Numidia in defiance of Roman decrees that divided it among several members of the royal family. After massacring a number of Italian traders who supported one of his rivals, indignation erupted as to Jugurtha's use of bribery to secure a favourable peace treaty; called to Rome to testify on bribery charges, he successfully plotted the assassination of one another royal claimant before returning home. After the war started, several Roman commanders were bribed (Bestia and Spurius), and one (Aulus Postumius Albinus) was defeated. In 109, Rome sent Quintus Caecilius Metellus to continue the war. Gaius Marius, a lieutenant of Metellus, returned to Rome to stand for the consulship in 107 BC. Marius was elected consul and, through assignment by tribunician legislation, took over the campaign. Sulla was assigned by lot to his staff.

When Marius took over the war, he entrusted Sulla to organise cavalry forces in Italy needed to pursue the mobile Numidians into the desert. If Sulla had married one of the Julii Caesares, this could explain Marius' willingness to entrust such an important task to a young man with no military experience, as Marius too had married into that family.

Under Marius, the Roman forces followed a very similar plan as under Metellus, capturing and garrisoning fortified positions in the African countryside. Sulla was popular with the men, charming and benign, he built up a healthy rapport while also winning popularity with other officers, including Marius. Ultimately, the Numidians were defeated in 106 BC, due in large part to Sulla's initiative in capturing the Numidian king. Jugurtha had fled to his father-in-law, King Bocchus I of Mauretania (a nearby kingdom); Marius invaded Mauretania, and after a pitched battle in which both Sulla and Marius played important roles in securing victory, Bocchus felt forced by Roman arms to betray Jugurtha. After the Senate approved negotiations with Bocchus, it delegated the talks to Marius, who appointed Sulla as envoy plenipotentiary. Winning Bocchus' friendship and making plain Rome's demands for Jugurtha's deliverance, Sulla successfully concluded negotiations and secured Bocchus' capture of Jugurtha and the king's rendition to Marius' camp. The publicity attracted by this feat boosted Sulla's political career. Years later, in 91 BC, Bocchus paid for the erection of gilded equestrian statue depicting Sulla's capture of Jugurtha.

Cimbrian War (104–101 BC) 

In 104 BC, the Cimbri and the Teutones, two Germanic tribes who had bested the Roman legions on several occasions, seemed to again be heading for Italy. Marius, in the midst of this military crisis, sought and won repeated consulships, which upset aristocrats in the Senate; they, however, likely acknowledged the indispensability of Marius' military capabilities in defeating the Germanic invaders. Amid a reorganisation of political alliances, the traditionalists in the Senate raised up Sulla – a patrician, even if a poor one, – as a counterweight against the newcomer Marius.

Starting in 104 BC, Marius moved to reform the defeated Roman armies in southern Gaul. Sulla then served as legate under his former commander and, in that stead, successfully subdued a Gallic tribe which revolted in the aftermath of a previous Roman defeat. The next year, Sulla was elected military tribune and served under Marius, and assigned to treat with the Marsi, part of the Germanic invaders, he was able to negotiate their defection from the Cimbri and Teutones. His prospects for advancement under Marius stalled, however, Sulla started to complain "most unfairly" that Marius was withholding opportunities from him. Demanding transfer to Catulus' (Marius' consular colleague) army, he received it. 

In 102 BC, the invaders returned and moved to force the Alps. Catulus, with Sulla, moved to block their advance; the two men likely cooperated well. But Catulus' army was defeated in the eastern Alps and withdrew from Venetia and thence to the southern side of the river Po. At the same time, Marius had annihilated the Cimbri's allies, the Teutones, at the Battle of Aquae Sextiae. Marius, elected again to the consulship of 101, came to Catulus' aid; Sulla, in charge of supporting army provisioning, did so competently and was able to feed both armies. The two armies then crossed the Po and attacked the Cimbri. After the failure of negotiations, the Romans and Cimbri engaged in the Battle of the Raudian Field in which the Cimbri were routed and destroyed.

Victorious, Marius and Catulus were both granted triumphs as the commanding generals. Refusing to stand for an aedileship (which, due to its involvement in hosting public games, was extremely expensive), Sulla became a candidate for the praetorship in 99 BC. He was, however, defeated. Campaigning on his military record, the people were unwilling to hear tales of military bravado from a mere junior officer after two triumphs. Moreover, the people knew that Sulla was friends with Bocchus, a rich foreign monarch, and rejected his standing for the praetorship to induce him to spend money on games. Sulla, undeterred, stood again for the praetorship the next year, promising he would pay for good shows; duly elected as praetor in 97 BC, he was assigned by lot to the urban praetorship.

Cilician governorship (96–93 BC) 

His term as praetor was largely uneventful, excepting a public dispute with Gaius Julius Caesar Strabo (possibly his brother-in-law) and his magnificent holding of the ludi Apollinares. The next year, 96 BC, he assigned – "probably pro consule as was customary" – to Cilicia in Asia Minor.

While governing Cilicia, Sulla received orders from the Senate to restore Ariobarzanes to the throne of Cappadocia. Ariobarzanes had been driven out by Mithridates VI of Pontus, who wanted to install one of his own sons (Ariarathes) on the Cappadocian throne. Despite initial difficulties, Sulla was successful with minimal resources and preparation; with few Roman troops, he hastily levied allied soldiers and advanced quickly into rugged terrain before routing superior enemy forces. His troops were sufficiently impressed by his leadership that they hailed him imperator.

Sulla's campaign in Cappadocia had led him to the banks of the Euphrates, where he was approached by an embassy from the Parthian Empire. Sulla was the first Roman magistrate to meet a Parthian ambassador. At the meeting, he took the seat between the Parthian ambassador, Orobazus, and Ariobarzanes, seeking to gain psychological advantage over the Partian envoy by portraying the Parthians and the Cappadocians as equals with Rome as superior. The Parthian ambassador, Orobazus, was executed upon his return to Parthia for allowing this humiliation; the Parthians, however, ratified the treaty reached, which established the Euphrates as a clear boundary between Parthia and Rome. At this meeting, Sulla was told by a Chaldean seer that he would die at the height of his fame and fortune. This prophecy was to have a powerful hold on Sulla throughout his lifetime.

In 94 BC, Sulla repulsed the forces of Tigranes the Great of Armenia from Cappadocia. He may have stayed in the east until 92 BC, when he returned to Rome. Keaveney places his departure to 93. Sulla was regarded to have done well in the east: he had restored Ariobarzanes to the throne, been hailed imperator by his men, and was the first Roman to treat successfully with the Parthians. With military and diplomatic victory, his political fortunes seemed positive. However, his candidature was dealt a blow when he was brought up on charges of extorting Ariobarzanes. Even though the prosecutor declined to show up on the day of the trial, leading to Sulla's victory by default, Sulla's ambitions were frustrated.

Social War 

Relations between Rome and its allies (the socii), had deteriorated over the years up to 91 BC. From 133 BC and the start of Tiberius Gracchus' land reforms, Italian communities were displaced from de jure Roman public lands over which no title had been enforced for generations. Various proposals to give the allies Roman citizenship over the decades had failed for various reasons, just as the allies also "became progressively more aware of the need to cease to be subjects and to share in the exercise of imperial power" by acquiring that citizenship. The Cimbric war also revived Italian solidarity, aided by Roman extension of corruption laws to allow allies to lodge extortion claims. When the pro-Italian plebeian tribune Marcus Livius Drusus was assassinated in 91 BC while trying again to pass a bill extending Roman citizenship, the Italians revolted.

The same year, Bocchus paid for the erection of a statue depicting Sulla's capture of Jugurtha. This may have been related to Sulla's campaign for the consulship. Regardless, if he had immediate plans for a consulship, they were forced into the background at the outbreak of war. At the start of the war, there were largely two theatres: a northern theatre from Picenum to the Fucine Lake and a southern theatre including Samnium. Sulla served as one of the legates in the southern theatre assigned to consul Lucius Julius Caesar.

In the first year of fighting, Roman strategy was largely one of containment, attempting to stop the revolting allies from spreading their rebellion into Roman-controlled territory. Sulla, in southern Italy, operated largely defensively on Lucius Julius Caesar's flank while the consul conducted offensive campaigning. Late in the year, Sulla cooperated with Marius (who was a legate in the northern theatre) in the northern part of southern Italy to defeat the Marsi: Marius defeated the Marsi, sending them headlong into Sulla's waiting forces. Sulla attempted also to assist Lucius' relief of the city of Aesernia, which was under siege, but both men were unsuccessful.

The next year, 89 BC, Sulla served as legate under the consul Lucius Porcius Cato. But after Cato's death in battle with the Marsi, Sulla was prorogued pro consule and placed in supreme command of the southern theatre. He brought Pompeii under siege. After one of the other legates was killed by his men, Sulla refused to discipline them except by issuing a proclamation imploring them to show more courage against the enemy. While besieging Pompeii, an Italian relief force came under Lucius Cluentius, which Sulla defeated and forced into flight towards Nola. Killing Cluentius before the city's walls, Sulla then invested the town and for his efforts was awarded a grass crown, the highest Roman military honour. Pompeii was taken some time during the year, along with Stabiae and Aeclanum; with the capture of Aeclanum, Sulla forced the Hirpini to surrender. He then attacked the Samnites and routed one of their armies near Aesernia before capturing the new Italian capital at Bovianum Undecimanorum. All of these victories would have been won before the consular elections in October 89.

Political developments in Rome also started to bring an end to the war. In 89 BC, one of the tribunes of the plebs passed the lex Plautia Papiria, which granted citizenship to all of the allies (with exception for the Samnites and Lucanians still under arms). This had been preceded by the lex Julia, passed by Lucius Julius Caesar in October 90 BC, which had granted citizenship to those allies who remained loyal. Buttressed by success against Rome's traditional enemies, the Samnites, and general Roman victory across Italy, Sulla stood for and was elected easily to the consulship of 88 BC; his colleague would be Quintus Pompeius Rufus.

First consulship 
 
 

Sulla's election to the consulship, successful likely due to his military success in 89 BC, was not uncontested. Gaius Julius Caesar Strabo, merely an ex-aedile and one of Sulla's long-time enemies, had contested the top magistracy. Beyond personal enmity, Caesar Strabo may also have stood for office because it was evident that Rome's relations with the Pontic king, Mithridates VI Eupator, were deteriorating and that the consuls of 88 would be assigned an extremely lucrative and glorious command against Pontus. Shortly after Sulla's election, probably in the last weeks of the year, Sulla married his daughter to one of his colleague Pompeius Rufus' sons. He also divorced his then-wife Cloelia and married Metella, widow of the recently-deceased Marcus Aemilius Scaurus. These marriages helped build political alliances with the influential Caecilii Metelli and the Pompeys.

Sulpicius 
Sulla started his consulship by passing two laws. 

Sulla became embroiled in a political fight against one of the plebeian tribunes, Publius Sulpicius Rufus, on the matter of how the new Italian citizens were to be distributed into the Roman tribes for purposes of voting. Sulla and Pompeius Rufus opposed the bill, which Sulpicius took as a betrayal; Sulpicius, without the support of the consuls, looked elsewhere for political allies. This led him to a secret deal with Marius, who had for years been coveting another military command, in which Marius would support Sulpicius' Italian legislation in exchange for a law transferring Sulla's command to Marius. Sulpicius' attempts to push through the Italian legislation again brought him into violent urban conflict, although he "offered nothing to the urban plebs... so it continued to resist him". The consuls, fearful of intimidation of Sulpicius and his armed bodyguards, declared a suspension of public business (iustitium) which led to Sulpicius and his mob forcing the consuls to flee. 

During the violence, Sulla was forced to shelter in Marius' nearby house (later denied in his memoirs). Marius arranged for Sulla to lift the iustitium and allow Sulpicius to bring proposals; Sulla, in a "desperately weak position... [received] little in return[,] perhaps no more than a promise that Sulla's life would be safe". Sulla then left for Capua before joining an army near Nola in southern Italy.

First march on Rome 

With Sulpicius able to enact legislation without consular opposition, Sulla discovered that Marius had tricked him, for the first piece of legislation Sulpicius brought was a law transferring the command against Mithridates to Marius. Thus,

Speaking to the men, Sulla complained to them of the outrageous behaviour of Marius and Sulpicius. He hinted to them that Marius would find other men to fight Mithridates, forcing them to give up opportunities to plunder the East, claims which were "surely false". The troops were willing to follow Sulla to Rome; his officers, however, realised Sulla's plans and deserted him (except his quaestor and kinsman, almost certainly Lucius Licinius Lucullus). They then killed Marcus Gratidius, one of Marius' legates, when Gratidius attempted to effect the transfer of command.

When the march on Rome started, the Senate and people were appalled. The Senate immediately sent an embassy demanding an explanation for his seeming march on the fatherland, to which Sulla responded boldly, saying that he was freeing it from tyrants. Without troops defending Rome itself, Sulla entered the city; once there, however, his men were pelted with stones from the rooftops by common people. Almost breaking before Marius' makeshift forces, Sulla then stationed troops all over the city before summoning the Senate and inducing it to outlaw Marius, Marius' son, Sulpicius, and nine others. He then reinforced this decision by legislation, retroactively justifying his illegal march on the city and stripping the twelve outlaws of their Roman citizenship. Of the twelve outlaws, only Sulpicius was killed after being betrayed by a slave. Marius and his son, along with some others, escaped to Africa.

Aftermath 
Sulla then had Sulpicius' legislation invalidated on the grounds that they had been passed by force. According only to Appian, he then brought legislation to strengthen the Senate's position in the state and weaken the plebeian tribunes by eliminating the comitia tributa as a legislative body and requiring that tribunes first receive senatorial approval for legislation; some scholars, however, reject Appian's account as mere retrojection of legislation passed during Sulla's dictatorship. He sent his army back to Capua and then conducted the elections for that year, which yielded a resounding rejection of him and his allies. His enemy, Lucius Cornelius Cinna, was elected consul for 87 BC in place of his candidate; his nephew was rejected as plebeian tribune while Marius' nephew was successful. Cinna, even before the election, said he would prosecute Sulla at the conclusion of the latter's consular term.

After the elections, Sulla forced the consuls designate to swear to uphold his laws. And for his consular colleague, he attempted to transfer to him the command of Gnaeus Pompeius Strabo's army. The law was vetoed by one of the tribunes, but when Quintus Pompeius Rufus went to Pompey Strabo's army to take command under the Senate's authority, he was promptly assassinated after his arrival and assumption of command, almost certainly on Strabo's orders. No action was taken against the troops nor action taken to relieve Pompey Strabo of command. He then left Italy with his troops without delay, ignoring legal summons and taking over command from a legate in Macedonia.

Sulla's ability to use military force against his own countrymen was "in many ways a continuation of the Social War... a civil war between former allies and friends developed into a civil war between citizens... what was eroded in the process was the fundamental distinction between Romans and foreign enemies". Political violence in Rome continued even in Sulla's absence. Cinna violently quarrelled with his co-consul, Gnaeus Octavius. After Octavius induced the senate to outlaw Cinna, Cinna suborned the army besieging Nola and induced the Italians again to rise up. Marius, offering his services to Cinna, helped levy troops. By the end of 87 BC, Cinna and Marius had besieged Rome and taken the city, killed consul Gnaeus Octavius, massacred their political enemies, and declared Sulla an outlaw; they then had themselves elected consuls for 86 BC.

Proconsulship

First Mithridatic War 

During close of the Social War, in 89 BC, Mithridates VI Eupator of Pontus invaded Roman Asia. In the summer of 88, he reorganised the administration of the area before unsuccessfully besieging Rhodes. News of these conquests reached Rome in the autumn of 89 BC, leading the Senate and people to declare war; actual preparations for war were, however, delayed: after Sulla was given the command, it took him some eighteen months to organise five legions before setting off; Rome was also severely strained financially. While Rome was preparing to move against Pontus, Mithridates arranged the massacre of some eighty thousand Roman and Italian expatriates and their families – known today as the Asiatic vespers – and confiscated their properties.

Mithridates' successes against the Romans incited a revolt by the Athenians against Roman rule. The Athenian politician Aristion had himself elected as strategos epi ton hoplon and established a tyranny over the city.  dismisses claims in Plutarch and Vellius Paterclus of Athens being forced to cooperate with Mithridates as "very hollow" and "apologia". Rome unsuccessfully defended Delos from an joint invasion by Athens and Pontus. They were, however, successful in holding Macedonia, then governed by propraetor Gaius Sentius and his legate Quintus Bruttius Sura.

Sack of Athens 

Early in 87 BC, Sulla transited the Adriatic for Thessaly with his five legions. Upon his arrival, Sulla had his quaestor Lucullus order Sura, who had vitally delayed Mithridates' advances into Greece, to retreat back into Macedonia. He separately besieged Athens and Piraeus (the Long Walls had since been demolished). Threatened by the Pontic navy, Sulla sent his quaestor Lucullus to scrounge about for allied naval forces. At the same time, Mithridates attempted to force a land battle in northern Greece, and dispatched a large army across the Hellespont. These sieges lasted until spring of 86 BC.

Discovering a weak point in the walls and popular discontent with the Athenian tyrant Aristion, Sulla stormed and captured Athens (except the Acropolis) on 1 March 86 BC. The Acropolis was then besieged. Athens itself was spared total destruction "in recognition of [its] glorious past" but the city was sacked. In need of resources, Sulla sacked the temples of Epidaurus, Delphi, and Olympia; after a battle with the Pontic general Archelaus outside Piraeus, Sulla's forces forced the Pontic garrison to withdraw by sea. Capturing the city, Sulla had it destroyed.

Boeotian battles 

In the summer of 86 BC, two major battles were fought in Boeotia. The Battle of Chaeronea was fought in early summer around the same time the Athenian acropolis was taken. The later battle, at Orchomenus, was fought in high summer but before the start of the autumn rains. The Pontic casualties given in Plutarch and Appian, the main sources for the battles, are exaggerated; Sulla's report that he suffered merely fifteen losses is not credible.

Sulla decamped his army from Attica toward central Greece. Having exhausted available provisions near Athens, doing so was both necessary to ensure the survival of his army and also to relieve a brigade of six thousand men cut off in Thessaly. He declined battle with Pontus at the hill Philoboetus near Chaeronea before manoeuvring to capture higher ground and build earthworks. After some days, both sides engaged in battle. The Romans neutralised a Pontic charge of scythed chariots before pushing the Pontic phalanx back across the plain. According to the ancient sources, Archelaus commanded between 60,000 and 120,000 men; in the aftermath, he allegedly escaped with only 10,000.

After the Battle of Chaeronea, Sulla learnt that Cinna's government had sent Lucius Valerius Flaccus to take over his command. Sulla had officially been declared an outlaw and in the eyes of the Cinnan regime, Flaccus was to take command of an army without a legal commander. Sulla moved to intercept Flaccus' army in Thessaly, but turned around when Pontic forces reoccupied Boetia. Turning south, he engaged the Pontic army – allegedly 90,000 – on the plain of Orchomenus. His troops prepared the ground by starting to dig a series of three trenches, which successfully contained Pontic cavalry. When the Pontic cavalry attacked to interrupt the earthworks, the Romans almost broke; Sulla personally rallied his men on foot and stabilised the area. Roman forces then surrounded the Pontic camp. Archelaus tried to break out but were unsuccessful; Sulla then annihilated the Pontic army and captured its camp. Archelaus then hid in the nearby marshes before escaping to Chalcis.

Peace with Mithridates 

In the aftermath of the battle, Sulla was approached by Archelaus for terms. With Mithridates' armies in Europe almost entirely destroyed, Archelaus and Sulla negotiated a set of relatively cordial peace terms which were then forwarded to Mithridates. Mithridates was to give Asia and Paphlagonia back to Rome. He was to return the kingdoms of Bithynia and Cappadocia to Nicomedes and Ariobarzanes, respectively. Mithridates also would equip Sulla with seventy or eighty ships and pay a war indemnity of two or three thousand talents. Sulla would ratify Mithridates' position in Pontus and have him declared a Roman ally.

Mithridates, still in Asia, was faced with local uprisings against his rule. Adding to his challenges was Lucullus' fleet, reinforced by Rhodian allies. When Flaccus' consular army marched through Macedonia towards Thrace, his command was usurped by his legate Gaius Flavius Fimbria, who had Flaccus killed before chasing Mithridates with his army into Asia itself. Faced with Fimbria's army in Asia, Lucullus' fleet off the coast, and internal unrest, Mithridates eventually met with Sulla at Dardanus in autumn 85 BC and accepted the terms negotiated by Archelaus.

After peace was reached, Sulla advanced on Fimbria's forces, which deserted their upstart commander. Fimbria then committed suicide after a failed attempt on Sulla's life. Sulla then settled affairs – "reparations, rewards, administrative and financial arrangements for the future" – in Asia, staying there until 84 BC. He then sailed for Italy at the head of 1,200 ships. 

The peace reached with Mithridates was condemned in ancient times as a betrayal of Roman interests for Sulla's private interest in fighting and winning the coming civil war. Modern sources have been somewhat less damning, as the Mithridatic campaigns later showed that no quick victory over Pontus was possible as long as Mithridates survived. However, this and Sulla's delay in Asia are "not enough to absolve him of the charge of being more concerned with revenge on opponents in Italy than with Mithridates". The extra time spent in Asia, moreover, equipped him with forces and money later put to good use in Italy.

Civil war 

Sulla crossed the Adriatic for Brundisium in spring of 83 BC with five legions of Mithridatic veterans, capturing Brundisium without a fight. Sulla's arrival in Brundisium induced defections from the Senate in Rome: Marcus Licinius Crassus, who had already fled from the Cinnan regime, raised an army in Spain, and departed for Africa to join with Metellus Pius (who also joined the Sullans), joined Sulla even before his landing in Italy. Pompey, the son of Pompey Strabo, raised a legion from his clients in Picenum and also joined Sulla; Sulla treated him with great respect and addressed him as imperator before dispatching him to raise more troops. Even those whom Sulla had quarrelled with (including Publius Cornelius Cethegus, whom Sulla had outlawed in 88 BC) defected to join his side.

The general feeling in Italy, however, was decidedly anti-Sullan; many people feared Sulla's wrath and still held memories of his extremely unpopular occupation of Rome during his consulship. The Senate moved the senatus consultum ultimum against him and was successful in levying large amount of men and materiel from the Italians. Sulla, buoyed by his previous looting in Asia, was able to advance quickly and largely without the ransacking of the Italian countryside. Advancing on Capua, he met the two consuls of that year – Lucius Cornelius Scipio Asiaticus and Gaius Norbanus – who had dangerously divided their forces. He defeated Norbanus at the Battle of Mount Tifata, forcing the consul to withdraw. Continuing towards Scipio's position at Teanum Sidicinum, Sulla negotiated and was almost able to convince Scipio to defect. Negotiations broke down after one of Scipio's lieutenants seized a town held by Sulla in violation of a ceasefire. The breakdown allowed Sulla to play the aggrieved party and place blame on his enemies for any further bloodshed. Scipio's army blamed him for the breakdown in negotiations and made it clear to the consul that they would not fight Sulla, who at this point appeared the peacemaker. Sulla, hearing this, feigned an attack while instructing his men to fraternise with Scipio's army. Scipio's men quickly abandoned him for Sulla; finding him almost alone in his camp, Sulla tried again to persuade Scipio to defect. When Scipio refused, Sulla let him go. Sulla attempted to open negotiations with Norbanus, who was at Capua, but Norbanus refused to treat and withdrew to Praeneste as Sulla advanced. While Sulla was moving in the south, Scipio fought Pompey in Picenum but was defeated when his troops again deserted. 

For 82 BC, the consular elections returned Gnaeus Papirius Carbo, in his third consulship, with the younger Gaius Marius, the son of the seven-time consul, who was then twenty-six. The remainder of 83 BC was dedicated to recruiting for the next year's campaign amid poor weather: Quintus Sertorius had raised a considerable force in Etruria, but was alienated from the consuls by the election of Gaius Marius' son rather than himself and so left to his praetorian province of Hispania Citerior; Sulla repudiated recognition of any treaties with the Samnites, whom he did not consider to be Roman citizens due to his rejection of Marius and Cinna's deal in 87 BC.

Fighting in 83 BC began with reverses for Sulla's opponents: their governors in Africa and Sardinia were deposed. When the campaign in Italy started, two theatres emerged, with Sulla facing the younger Marius in the south and Metellus Pius facing Carbo in the north. Marius, buttressed by Samnite support, fought a long and hard battle with Sulla at Sacriportus that resulted in defeat when five of his cohorts defected. After the battle, Marius withdrew to Praeneste and was there besieged. 

After the younger Marius' defeat, Sulla had the Samnite war captives massacred, which triggered an uprising in his rear. He left one of his allies, Quintus Lucretius Afella to maintain the siege at Praeneste and moved for Rome. At the same time, the younger Marius sent word to assemble the Senate and purge it of suspected Sullan sympathisers: the urban praetor Lucius Junius Brutus Damasippus then had four prominent men killed at the ensuing meeting. The purge did little to strengthen resolve and when Sulla arrived at Rome, the city opened its gates and his opponents fled. Sulla had his enemies declared hostes, probably from outside the pomerium, and after assembling an assembly where he apologised for the ongoing war, left to fight Carbo in Etruria.

Carbo, who had suffered defeats by Metellus Pius and Pompey, attempted to redeploy so to relieve his co-consul Marius at Praeneste. Skilfully withdrawing to Clusium, he delegated to Norbanus command of troops to hold Metellus Pius. There, Sulla attacked him in an indecisive battle. Pompey ambushed eight legions sent to relieve Praeneste but an uprising from the Samnites and the Lucanians forced Sulla to deploy south as they moved also to relieve Praeneste or join with Carbo in the north. Sulla's specific movements are very vaguely described in Appian, but he was successful in preventing the Italians from relieving Praeneste or joining with Carbo. In the north at the same time, Norbanus was defeated and fled for Rhodes, where he eventually committed suicide. After another attempt to relieve Praeneste failed, Carbo lost his nerve and attempted to retreat to Africa; his lieutenants attempted again to relieve Praeneste but after that again failed, marched on Rome to force Sulla from his well-defended positions. Sulla hurried in full force towards Rome and there fought the Battle of the Colline Gate on the afternoon of 1 November 82 BC. Sulla himself was defeated and forced to flee into his camp, but his lieutenant Crassus on the right wing won the battle in the night. The Samnite and anti-Sullan commanders were then hunted down as "for all intents and purposes the civil war in Italy was over".

Dictatorship and constitutional reforms

After the battle at the Colline Gate, Sulla summoned the Senate to the temple of Bellona at the Campus Martius. There, while giving a speech, he had three or four thousand Samnite prisoners butchered, to the shock of the attending senators. Sulla marched to Praeneste and forced its siege to a close, with the younger Marius dead from suicide before its surrender. 

Sulla had his stepdaughter Aemilia (daughter of princeps senatus Marcus Aemilius Scaurus) married to Pompey, although she shortly died in childbirth. Pompey was then dispatched to recover Sicily. With the capture and execution of Carbo, who had fled Sicily for Egypt, both consuls for 82 BC were now dead.

Proscription 
In total control of the city and its affairs, Sulla instituted a series of proscriptions (a program of executing and confiscating the property of those whom he perceived as enemies of the state). Plutarch states in his Life of Sulla that "Sulla now began to make blood flow, and he filled the city with deaths without number or limit," further alleging that many of the murdered victims had nothing to do with Sulla, though Sulla killed them to "please his adherents."

Sulla immediately proscribed 80 persons without communicating with any magistrate. As this caused a general murmur, he let one day pass, and then proscribed 220 more, and again on the third day as many. In an harangue to the people, he said, with reference to these measures, that he had proscribed all he could think of, and as to those who now escaped his memory, he would proscribe them at some future time.

The proscriptions are widely perceived as a response to similar killings that Marius and Cinna had implemented while they controlled the Republic during Sulla's absence. Proscribing or outlawing every one of those whom he perceived to have acted against the best interests of the Republic while he was in the east, Sulla ordered some 1,500 nobles (i.e. senators and equites) executed, although  as many as 9,000 people were estimated to have been killed. The purge went on for several months. Helping or sheltering a proscribed person was punishable by death, while killing a proscribed person was rewarded with two talents. Family members of the proscribed were not excluded from punishment, and slaves were not excluded from rewards. As a result, "husbands were butchered in the arms of their wives, sons in the arms of their mothers." The majority of the proscribed had not been enemies of Sulla, but instead were killed for their property, which was confiscated and auctioned off. The proceeds from auctioned property more than made up for the cost of rewarding those who killed the proscribed, filling the treasury. Possibly to protect himself from future political retribution, Sulla had the sons and grandsons of the proscribed banned from running for political office, a restriction not removed for over 30 years.

The young Gaius Julius Caesar, as Cinna's son-in-law, became one of Sulla's targets, and fled the city. He was saved through the efforts of his relatives, many of whom were Sulla's supporters, but Sulla noted in his memoirs that he regretted sparing Caesar's life, because of the young man's notorious ambition. Historian Suetonius records that when agreeing to spare Caesar, Sulla warned those who were pleading his case that he would become a danger to them in the future, saying, "In this Caesar, there are many Mariuses."

Dictator 
At the end of 82 BC or the beginning of 81 BC, the Senate appointed Sulla dictator legibus faciendis et reipublicae constituendae causa ("dictator for the making of laws and for the settling of the constitution"). The assembly of the people subsequently ratified the decision, with no limit set on his time in office. Sulla had total control of the city and Republic of Rome, except for Hispania (which Marius' general Quintus Sertorius had established as an independent state). This unusual appointment (used hitherto only in times of extreme danger to the city, such as during the Second Punic War, and then only for 6-month periods) represented an exception to Rome's policy of not giving total power to a single individual. Sulla can be seen as setting the precedent for Julius Caesar's dictatorship, and for the eventual end of the Republic under Augustus.

Reforms 
Sulla, who opposed the Gracchian popularis reforms, was an optimate; though his coming to the side of the traditional Senate originally could be described as atavistic when dealing with the tribunate and legislative bodies, while more visionary when reforming the court system, governorships, and membership of the Senate. As such, he sought to strengthen the aristocracy, and thus the Senate. Sulla retained his earlier reforms, which required senatorial approval before any bill could be submitted to the Plebeian Council (the principal popular assembly), and which had also restored the older, more aristocratic "Servian" organization to the Centuriate Assembly (assembly of soldiers). Sulla, himself a patrician, thus ineligible for election to the office of Plebeian Tribune, thoroughly disliked the office. As Sulla viewed the office, the tribunate was especially dangerous, and his intention was to not only deprive the Tribunate of power, but also of prestige (Sulla himself had been officially deprived of his eastern command through the underhanded activities of a tribune). Over the previous 300 years, the tribunes had directly challenged the patrician class and attempted to deprive it of power in favor of the plebeian class. Through Sulla's reforms to the Plebeian Council, tribunes lost the power to initiate legislation. Sulla then prohibited ex-tribunes from ever holding any other office, so ambitious individuals would no longer seek election to the tribunate, since such an election would end their political career. Finally, Sulla revoked the power of the tribunes to veto acts of the Senate, although he left intact the tribunes' power to protect individual Roman citizens.

Sulla then increased the number of magistrates elected in any given year, and required that all newly elected quaestores gain automatic membership in the Senate. These two reforms were enacted primarily to allow Sulla to increase the size of the Senate from 300 to 600 senators. This also removed the need for the censor to draw up a list of senators, since more than enough former magistrates were always available to fill the Senate. To further solidify the prestige and authority of the Senate, Sulla transferred the control of the courts from the equites, who had held control since the Gracchi reforms, to the senators. This, along with the increase in the number of courts, further added to the power that was already held by the senators. Sulla also codified, and thus established definitively, the cursus honorum, which required an individual to reach a certain age and level of experience before running for any particular office. Sulla also wanted to reduce the risk that a future general might attempt to seize power, as he himself had done. To this end, he reaffirmed the requirement that any individual wait for 10 years before being re-elected to any office. Sulla then established a system where all consuls and praetors served in Rome during their year in office, and then commanded a provincial army as a governor for the year after they left office.

Finally, in a demonstration of his absolute power, Sulla expanded the Pomerium, the sacred boundary of Rome, unchanged since the time of the kings. Sulla's reforms both looked to the past (often repassing former laws) and regulated for the future, particularly in his redefinition of maiestas (treason) laws and in his reform of the Senate.

At the start of his second consulship in 80 BC with Metellus Pius, Sulla resigned his dictatorship. He also disbanded his legions and, through these gestures, attempted to show the re-establishment of normal consular government. He dismissed his lictores and walked unguarded in the Forum, offering to give account of his actions to any citizen. In a manner that the historian Suetonius thought arrogant, Julius Caesar later mocked Sulla for resigning the dictatorship.

Retirement and death
As promised, when his tasks were complete, Sulla returned his powers and withdrew to his country villa near Puteoli to be with his family. Plutarch states in his Life of Sulla that he retired to a life spent in dissolute luxuries, and he "consorted with actresses, harpists, and theatrical people, drinking with them on couches all day long." From this distance, Sulla remained out of the day-to-day political activities in Rome, intervening only a few times when his policies were involved (e.g. the execution of Granius, shortly before his own death).

Sulla's goal now was to write his memoirs, which he finished in 78 BC, just before his death. They are now largely lost, although fragments from them exist as quotations in later writers. Ancient accounts of Sulla's death indicate that he died from liver failure or a ruptured gastric ulcer (symptomized by a sudden hemorrhage from his mouth, followed by a fever from which he never recovered), possibly caused by chronic alcohol abuse. Accounts were also written that he had an infestation of worms, caused by the ulcers, which led to his death.

His public funeral in Rome (in the Forum, in the presence of the whole city) was on a scale unmatched until that of Augustus in AD 14. Sulla's body was brought into the city on a golden bier, escorted by his veteran soldiers, and funeral orations were delivered by several eminent senators, with the main oration possibly delivered by Lucius Marcius Philippus or Hortensius. Sulla's body was cremated and his ashes placed in his tomb in the Campus Martius. An epitaph, which Sulla composed himself, was inscribed onto the tomb, reading, "No friend ever served me, and no enemy ever wronged me, whom I have not repaid in full." Plutarch claims he had seen Sulla's personal motto carved on his tomb on the Campus Martius. The personal motto was "no better friend, no worse enemy."

Legacy

Sulla is generally seen as having set the precedent for Caesar's march on Rome and dictatorship. Cicero comments that Pompey once said, "If Sulla could, why can't I?" Sulla's example proved that it could be done, therefore inspiring others to attempt it; in this respect, he has been seen as another step in the Republic's fall. Further, Sulla failed to frame a settlement whereby the army (following the Marian reforms allowing nonland-owning soldiery) remained loyal to the Senate, rather than to generals such as himself. He attempted to mitigate this by passing laws to limit the actions of generals in their provinces, and although these laws remained in effect well into the imperial period, they did not prevent determined generals, such as Pompey and Julius Caesar, from using their armies for personal ambition against the Senate, a danger of which Sulla was intimately aware.

While Sulla's laws such as those concerning qualification for admittance to the Senate, reform of the legal system and regulations of governorships remained on Rome's statutes long into the principate, much of his legislation was repealed less than a decade after his death. The veto power of the tribunes and their legislating authority were soon reinstated, ironically during the consulships of Pompey and Crassus.

Sulla's descendants continued to be prominent in Roman politics into the imperial period. His son, Faustus Cornelius Sulla, issued denarii bearing the name of the dictator, as did a grandson, Quintus Pompeius Rufus. His descendants among the Cornelii Sullae would hold four consulships during the imperial period: Lucius Cornelius Sulla in 5 BC, Faustus Cornelius Sulla in AD 31, Lucius Cornelius Sulla Felix in AD 33, and Faustus Cornelius Sulla Felix in 52 AD (he was the son of the consul of 31, and the husband of Claudia Antonia, daughter of the emperor Claudius). His execution in AD 62 on the orders of emperor Nero made him the last of the Cornelii Sullae.

His rival, Gnaeus Papirius Carbo, described Sulla as having the cunning of a fox and the courage of a lion – but that it was his cunning that was by far the most dangerous. This mixture was later referred to by Machiavelli in his description of the ideal characteristics of a ruler.

Cultural references
 The dictator is the subject of four Italian operas, two of which take considerable liberties with history: Lucio Silla by Wolfgang Amadeus Mozart and Silla by George Frideric Handel. In each, he is portrayed as a bloody, womanizing, ruthless tyrant who eventually repents his ways and steps down from the throne of Rome. Pasquale Anfossi and Johann Christian Bach also wrote operas on this subject.
 Sulla is a character in Taylor Caldwell's novel A Pillar Of Iron; in it, he has Marcus Tullius Cicero's injured brother, Quintus, recovering in his home, as Quintus is a soldier under his command. He is shown as cold, calculating and ruthless, yet a devoted leader to his men and sternly wedded to his personal ideals for Rome.
 Sulla is a central character in the first three Masters of Rome novels, by Colleen McCullough. Sulla is depicted as ruthless and amoral, very self-assured, and personally brave and charming, especially with women. His charm and ruthlessness make him a valuable aide to Gaius Marius. Sulla’s desire to move out of the shadow of aging Marius eventually leads to civil war. Sulla softened considerably after the birth of his son, and was devastated when the boy died at a young age. The novels depict Sulla full of regrets about having to put aside his homosexual relationship with a Greek actor to take up his public career.
 Sulla is played by Richard Harris in the 2002 miniseries Julius Caesar.
 Lucius Cornelius Sulla is also a character in the first book of the Emperor novels by Conn Iggulden, which are centered around the lives of Gaius Julius Caesar and Marcus Junius Brutus.
 Sulla is a major character in Roman Blood, the first of the Roma Sub Rosa mystery novels by Steven Saylor.
 Sulla is the subject of The Sword of Pleasure, a novel by Peter Green published in the UK in 1957. The novel is in the form of an autobiography.

Marriages and children
 His first wife was Ilia, according to Plutarch. If Plutarch's text is to be amended to "Julia", then she is likely to have been one of the Julias related to Julius Caesar, most likely Julia Caesaris, Caesar's first cousin once removed. They had two children:
 The first was Cornelia, who first married Quintus Pompeius Rufus the Younger and later Mamercus Aemilius Lepidus Livianus, giving birth to Pompeia (second wife of Julius Caesar) with the former.
 The second was Lucius Cornelius Sulla, who died young.
 His second wife was Aelia.
 His third wife was Cloelia, whom Sulla divorced due to sterility.
 His fourth wife was Caecilia Metella, with whom he also had two children:
 They had twins Faustus Cornelius Sulla, who was a quaestor in 54 BC, and Fausta Cornelia, who first married Gaius Memmius (praetor in 58 BC), then later Titus Annius Milo (praetor in 54 BC). Fausta's son from her first marriage was Gaius Memmius, suffect consul in 34 BC.
 His fifth and last wife was Valeria, with whom he had only one child, Cornelia Postuma, who was born after Sulla's death.

Appearance and character
Sulla was red-blond and blue-eyed, and had a dead-white face covered with red marks. Plutarch notes that Sulla considered that "his golden head of hair gave him a singular appearance."

He was said to have a duality between being charming, easily approachable, and able to joke and cavort with the most simple of people, while also assuming a stern demeanor when he was leading armies and as dictator. An example of the extent of his charming side was that his soldiers would sing a ditty about Sulla's one testicle, although without truth, to which he allowed as being "fond of a jest." This duality, or inconsistency, made him very unpredictable and "at the slightest pretext, he might have a man crucified, but, on another occasion, would make light of the most appalling crimes; or he might happily forgive the most unpardonable offenses, and then punish trivial, insignificant misdemeanors with death and confiscation of property."

His excesses and penchant for debauchery could be attributed to the difficult circumstances of his youth, such as losing his father while he was still in his teens and retaining a doting stepmother, necessitating an independent streak from an early age. The circumstances of his relative poverty as a young man left him removed from his patrician brethren, enabling him to consort with revelers and experience the baser side of human nature. This "firsthand" understanding of human motivations and the ordinary Roman citizen may explain why he was able to succeed as a general despite lacking any significant military experience before his 30s.

The historian Sallust fleshes out this character sketch of Sulla:

Chronology
 circa 138 BC: Born in Rome;
 110 BC: Marries first wife;
 107-105 BC: Quaestor and pro quaestore to Gaius Marius in the war with Jugurtha in Numidia;
 106 BC: End of Jugurthine War;
 104 BC: Legatus to Marius (serving his second consulship) in Gallia Transalpina;
 103 BC: Tribunus militum in the army of Marius (serving his third consulship) in Gallia Transalpina;
 102-101 BC: Legatus to Quintus Lutatius Catulus (who was consul at the time) and pro consule in Gallia Cisalpina;
 101 BC: Took part in the defeat of the Cimbri at the Battle of Vercellae
 97 BC: Praetor urbanus
 96 BC: Propraetor of the province of Cilicia, pro consule;
 90-89 BC: Senior officer in the Social War, as legatus pro praetore;
 88 BC:
 Holds the consulship for the first time, with Quintus Pompeius Rufus as colleague
 Invades Rome and outlaws Marius
 87 BC: Commands Roman armies to fight King Mithridates of Pontus
 86 BC: Participates in the sack of Athens, the battle of Chaeronea and the battle of Orchomenus.
 85 BC: Liberates the provinces of Macedonia, Asia, and Cilicia from Pontic occupation
 84 BC: Reorganizes the province of Asia
 83 BC: Returns to Italy and undertakes civil war against the factional Marian government
 83-82 BC: Enters war with the followers of Gaius Marius the Younger and Cinna
 82 BC: Obtains victory at the battle of the Colline Gate
 82/81 BC: Appointed dictator legibus faciendis et rei publicae constituendae causa
 80 BC: Holds the consulship for the second time. His colleague was Metellus Pius. Resigned the dictatorship at the beginning of the year
 79 BC: Retires from political life, refusing the post consulatum provincial command of Gallia Cisalpina he was allotted as consul, but retaining the curatio for the reconstruction of the temples on the Capitoline Hill.
 78 BC: Dies, perhaps of an intestinal ulcer, with funeral held in Rome

See also

References

Citations

Modern sources

Ancient sources

External links

 
 Plutarch's Life of Sulla

 
138 BC births
78 BC deaths
2nd-century BC Romans
1st-century BC Roman augurs
1st-century BC Roman consuls
1st-century BC Roman praetors
Ancient Roman dictators
Ancient Roman generals
Cornelii Sullae
Leaders who took power by coup
Memoirists
Optimates
Roman patricians
Roman governors of Cilicia
Roman governors of Hispania
Romans who received the grass crown